Batnara is a village in Khyber Pakhtunkhwa province of Pakistan. It is located at 34°22'25N 73°40'0E with an altitude of 2093 metres (6870 feet).

References

Villages in Khyber Pakhtunkhwa